Liwonde, or Livonde, is a town located in Machinga District, in the Southern Region of Malawi.

Geography
Located in Machinga District in the Southern Region of Malawi, Liwonde is located in the Shire River valley. Its main landmark is the road that connects Zomba to Lilongwe, making the town an important crossroads between Balaka, Machinga, Mangochi and Zomba.

Another important Liwonde landmark is the Liwonde National Park nature conservation area. The town thus serves as a dormitory, support center and access base for tourists and researchers traveling to Liwonde National Park. Trips to the interior of the park depart from Liwonde by sailing along the Shire River (year-round) or by car on the access roads.

Demographics 
The main ethnic groups in the town are the Chewas and the Yaos, with minorities of the Ngoni and Lomwe peoples. There is an important group of expatriates left over from the Mozambican civil war, as well as Asian immigrants.

Climate 
In the region of the town of Liwonde, the tropical savanna climate (Aw) prevails, with a hot thermal sensation throughout the day.

Vegetation 
The savannah that surrounds the town is characterized by the small amount of trees, especially the many bushes. Among the large trees, the baobab stands out.

Economy 

Liwonde's economy is basically agricultural, centered on the production of corn flour, tomatoes, onions, cabbage, bananas, pumpkins, cassava, sweet potatoes, Irish potatoes, sugar cane, rice and beans. There is also an important breeding of goats for meat consumption, as well as poultry breeding for egg consumption.

As a regional hub for neighboring towns, Liwonde is home to retail shopping centers such as PTC, McConnell's and Euro Superette, which supply the town with food, sundries and beverages.

Infrastructure
In 2002, the town had a residential supply of water and electricity, but it was not available to the majority of the population. There was also landline and mobile telephony, with signal failures. Liwonde also had a hospital.

The town has a railway station on the Nacala railway, under concession of Central East African Railways. The town of Liwonde has one of the most important railway stations on the Nacala railway, linking Mwanza and Nkaya (west) to Nayuchi and Port of Nacala (east).

References 

Populated places in Southern Region, Malawi